Fort Parramatta was the name was given to a fort north of Wellington, New Zealand, in the 1840s. The remains of the fort are still visible on the Ngatitoa Domain in Porirua City, but the surrounding suburb name has been changed to "Paremata".

External links
Archaeology of Porirua - illustrated by photo of the remains of the fort
 
City Council definition of suburbs 

Buildings and structures in Porirua
History of the Wellington Region
Paremata
1840s architecture in New Zealand
Forts in New Zealand